Begin (stylized as BEGIN.) is the fifth studio album by American singer David Archuleta. The album is composed of nine cover songs and one original track.

Album information 
The album was released on August 7, 2012, under Deseret Book's label, Highway Records, (formerly known as Lightwave Records), a subsidiary of Shadow Mountain. The album consists of ten tracks, nine of which are cover songs by Archuleta and one of them, titled "Broken" is an entirely new song co-written and sung by Archuleta himself. Archuleta said about the album "I wanted to still be able to give people an idea of what it's like for me and find songs that they can connect with as well."
A music video for the song "Everybody Hurts" was released on August 23. The video was directed by Jed Wells and features footage from Archuleta recording the song in the studio the day before he left on his mission.

The album was released in Malaysia through Sony Music
and in Philippines by Ivory Records.

Track listing

Reception 
The album sold around 11,000 copies in its first week and debuted at number 28 on the US Billboard 200 chart.

Charts

Release history

References 

2012 albums
David Archuleta albums